This is a list of drama films of the 1910s.

1910

 The Abyss
 The Actor's Children
 All on Account of the Milk
 The American and the Queen
 An Arcadian Maid
 Arsène Lupin contra Sherlock Holmes
 Avenged
 The Best Man Wins
 The Bravest Girl of the South
 The Broken Oath
 The Castaways
 A Christmas Carol
 The Conspiracy of Pontiac
 Cupid at the Circus
 A Dainty Politician
 The Doctor's Carriage
 The Fisherman's Granddaughter
 The Flag of His Country
 The Fugitive
 The Further Adventures of the Girl Spy
 The Girl Strike Leader
 The Girl Spy Before Vicksburg
 The Governor's Daughter
 Grandmother's War Story
 Her Soldier Sweetheart
 The House with Closed Shutters
 Hypnotized 
 In the Border States
 In Old California
 Jane Eyre
 Jean and the Calico Doll
 John Halifax, Gentleman
 The Kid
 King Lear
 The Lad from Old Ireland
 Lena Rivers
 The Little Hero of Holland
 The Little Spreewald Maiden
 Looking Forward
 The Lucky Shot
 The Man Who Lost
 The Millionaire Milkman
 The Miser's Child
 Mistress and Maid
 Mother
 The Navajo's Bride
 Not Guilty
 The Perversity of Fate
 The Picture of Dorian Gray
 The Playwright's Love
 Ramona
 The Restoration
 Rip Van Winkle
 The Seminole Halfbreeds
 The Seminole's Trust
 She Stoops to Conquer
 The Stranger (1910 film)
 The Unchanging Sea
 Uncle Tom's Cabin
 The Woman Hater (Thanhouser Company)
 The Writing on the Wall
 Young Lord Stanley

1911

 Adrift
 The Battle
 Behind the Stockade
 Brown of Harvard
 The Buddhist Priestess
 Cally's Comet
 The Colonel and the King
 The Colonel's Son
 David Copperfield
 Enoch Arden
 Flames and Fortune
 For Her Sake
 For the Love of an Enemy
 For Washington
 Henry VIII
 Her Awakening
 The Higher Law
 His Trust
 His Trust Fulfilled
 The Hunchback of Notre Dame
 L'Inferno
 In Blossom Time
 The Lighthouse by the Sea
 The Lonedale Operator
 The Military Air-Scout
 The Miser's Heart
 The New Superintendent
 The Norwood Necklace
 The Old Curiosity Shop
 The Open Road
 The Pasha's Daughter
 The Railroad Builder
 The Railroad Raiders of '62
 Rory O'More
 The Scarlet Letter
 The Secret of the Still
 Silver Threads Among the Gold
 The Smuggler
 Stage Struck
 The Stuff Heroes Are Made Of
 Sweet Memories
 A Tale of Two Cities
 Tangled Lives
 That's Happiness
 The Tempest
 Through Darkened Vales
 The Two Paths
 The Voice of the Child
 The Vote That Counted
 What Shall We Do with Our Old?
 A Woman Scorned

1912

 Aurora Floyd
 Baby Hands
 A Battle of Wits
 Brutality
 The Burglar's Dilemma
 The County Fair
 A Cry for Help
 The Deserter
 From the Manger to the Cross
 The God Within
 Gold and Glitter
 Heredity
 In the Aisles of the Wild
 In Nacht und Eis
 The Informer
 It Happened Thus
 The Land Beyond the Sunset
 The Little Girl Next Door
 Maud Muller
 The Musketeers of Pig Alley
 A New Cure for Divorce
 The New York Hat
 The Painted Lady
 Please Help the Pore
 The Power of Melody
 A Primitive Man's Career to Civilization
 Put Yourself in His Place
 Richard III
 Saved from the Titanic
 The Street Singer
 The Tell-Tale Message
 The Thunderbolt
 Two Daughters of Eve
 The Voice of Conscience
 The Young Millionaire

1914
 The Mother and the Law
 The Squaw Man
 What's His Name
 Zijn viool

1915

 $1,000 Reward
 The Ambition of the Baron
 Anna Karenina
 The Beachcomber
 The Birth of a Nation
 The Boss
 The Bottle
 Camille
 Carmen - Raoul Walsh film
 Carmen - Cecil B. DeMille film
 The Case of Becky
 Coals of Fire
 The Devil
 The Devil's Daughter
 The Edge of the Abyss
 Esmeralda
 The Eternal City
 A Fool There Was
 From Shopgirl to Duchess
 Gladiola (film)
 The Goose Girl
 Home
 The House of the Lost Court
 The Immigrant (1915 film)
 Jane Shore
 Lady Audley's Secret
 The Lily and the Rose
 Madame Butterfly
 Martyrs of the Alamo
 The Moonstone
 The Picture of Dorian Gray (1915 film)
 Rags
 Samson
 The Second in Command
 The Star of the Sea
 Steady Company
 The Threads of Fate
 The Trust
 Truth Stranger Than Fiction
 The White Sister

1916

 The Abandonment
 The Almighty Dollar
 Audrey
 Behind the Lines
 The Blacklist
 The Brand of Cowardice
 The Call of the Cumberlands
 The Chance of a Lifetime
 The City
 The Code of Marcia Gray
 David Garrick
 The Devil's Own
 Diplomacy
 Disraeli
 Dr. Wake's Patient
 Driven
 East Is East
 The Evil Thereof
 The Gamble
 The Gilded Cage
 Guilty
 Intolerance
 The Intrigue
 The King's Daughter
 Kiss of Death
 The Lash
 Lights of New York
 The Little Damozel
 The Lyons Mail
 The Making of Maddalena
 Playing with Fire
 Public Opinion
 The Queen of Spades
 The Rise of Susan
 The Road to Love
 Romeo and Juliet (1916 Fox film)
 Romeo and Juliet (1916 Metro Pictures film)
 Secret Love
 The Selfish Woman
 The Serpent
 Seven Keys to Baldpate
 Sherlock Holmes
 Shoes
 Slander
 The Soul Market
 Sparrows
 The Spider
 The Stepping Stone
 The Storm
 Stranded
 The Stronger Love
 Tales of Hoffmann
 Therèse
 The Thoroughbred
 Under Cover
 Under Two Flags
 The Velvet Paw
 The Vicar of Wakefield
 The Victim
 Where Are My Children?
 The Yellow Passport

1917

 The Auction Block
 Berg-Ejvind och hans hustru
 Camille
 The Climber
 The Crisis
 Culprit
 Daughter of Destiny
 The Debt
 Dombey and Son
 Enlighten Thy Daughter
 Eternal Love
 The Evil Eye
 Freckles
 Great Expectations
 The Happy Warrior
 Heart and Soul
 The Hostage
 The House Opposite
 If Thou Wert Blind
 Iracema
 The Jury of Fate
 Life Is a Dream
 A Little Princess
 Little Women
 The Lost Chord
 Love Letters
 The Mirror
 The Mortal Sin
 Nina, the Flower Girl
 Outcast
 Pardners
 Poppy
 Queen X
 Redemption
 Reputation
 The Rescue
 The Slave
 The Spendthrift
 A Tale of Two Cities
 Thais
 The Tiger Woman

1918

 Anna Karenina
 The Bells
 Brown of Harvard
 By Right of Purchase
 Carmen
 The Crusaders
 The Danger Mark
 A Daughter of the Old South
 Daybreak
 A Doll's House
 The Elder Miss Blossom
 Eye for Eye
 The Family Skeleton
 The Firefly of France
 The Glorious Adventure
 The Great Adventure
 The Guilty Man
 The Hanging Judge
 Her Final Reckoning
 The Hidden Pearls
 The Hunter of Fall
 I Love You
 Just a Woman
 The Kaiser's Shadow
 Kildare of Storm
 The Law of the North
 Lest We Forget
 The Lie
 Madame Jealousy
 The Married Virgin
 Nine-Tenths of the Law
 The Panther Woman
 The Picture of Dorian Gray

1919

 After Many Days
 The Avalanche
 Ave Caesar!
 Blind Husbands
 Bolshevism on Trial
 The Boy in Blue
 Broken in the Wars
 The Career of Katherine Bush
 Come Out of the Kitchen
 The Courageous Coward
 The End of the Road
 Eve in Exile
 Everywoman
 Eyes of Youth
 The Face at the Window
 The Final Close-Up
 Flame of the Desert
 For Better, for Worse
 Forbidden
 The Garden of Resurrection
 The Great Air Robbery
 The Grim Game
 Harakiri
 His Dearest Possession
 Human Desire
 Intoxication
 J'accuse
 The Jewess of Toledo
 Keeper of the Door
 The Lady Clare
 The Lion's Den
 Mr. Wu
 The Mystery of the Yellow Room
 The Nature of the Beast
 The New Moon
 Open Your Eyes
 The Other Half
 Paid in Full
 The Rocks of Valpre
 Rose Bernd
 Secret Service
 Sir Arne's Treasure
 Soldiers of Fortune
 The Splendid Romance
 Thin Ice
 Under Suspicion
 What Every Woman Wants
 The Woman Next Door
 A Society Exile
 The World and Its Woman
 You Never Saw Such a Girl

References

Drama
1910s